Hymenocallis littoralis or the beach spider lily is a plant species of the genus Hymenocallis, native to warmer coastal regions of Latin America and widely cultivated and naturalized in many tropical countries.

Description

Hymenocallis littoralis is a bulbous perennial herb. It ranges in height from 60–70 cm (24-28 inches). The bulb is 7–10 cm (3-4 inches) in diameter. With age, the bulb develops a neck that reaches 4–5 cm in diameter (up to 2 inches). The flowers are large, white, vanilla scented, and sessile. The tepals are adnate (attached to) the staminal cup. Each flower's tube is 14 to 17 cm (5 to 7 inches) long or longer.

Distribution

Hymenocallis littoralis is regarded as native to Belize, Brazil, Colombia, Costa Rica, Honduras, Mexico, Nicaragua, Panama, Peru and Venezuela. It is considered naturalized in Angola, the Bismarck Archipelago, Cape Verde, the Caroline Islands, the Central African Republic, the Chagos Archipelago, Ecuador, Equatorial Guinea, Fiji, French Guiana, The Gambia, the Gilbert Islands, Guinea, Guinea-Bissau, the Gulf of Guinea Islands, Hawaii, India, Java, the Line Islands, Marianas, Marquesas, the Marshall Islands, Mauritius, Nauru, Niue, Ogasawara-shoto, the Philippines, Samoa, the Seychelles, the Society Islands, Sri Lanka, Suriname, Tonga, Wake Island,Malaysia, Zaire and Zambia.

Horticulture

Hymenocallis littoralis is often grown as an ornamental. It requires sunlight to partial shade for proper growth and blooms from mid-summer to late autumn with white flowers. It may be grown aquatically.

Hymenocallis littoralis is included in the Tasmanian Fire Service's list of low flammability plants, indicating that it is suitable for growing within a building protection zone.

Etymology
Hymenocallis is derived from Greek and means 'membraned beauty', a reference to its filament cup.

Littoralis means 'growing by the seashore'.

References

External links
 Pacific Bulb Society
 USDA Profile
 IPNI Listing

littoralis
Flora of Mexico
Flora of Central America
Flora of South America
Plants described in 1812